Screencraft Productions was a short lived production company which worked out of Hollywood in the 1930s. Sam Katzman was production supervisor. It was linked with Showmen's Pictures.

References

External links
Screencraft Productions at IMDb
Showmen's Pictures at IMDb

Film production companies of the United States